Outside: From the Redwoods is the second live album released by American singer-songwriter Kenny Loggins. Released in August 1993, it is the recording of his June 1993 concert held "outside" at a venue located within a stand of giant redwood trees. The album features reworked versions of many of Loggins' songs, both from his solo work and his earlier work in Loggins and Messina. Michael McDonald gives a guest performance on a reworked version of their classic co-written, "What a Fool Believes", and R&B singer Shanice gives guest performances on "I Would Do Anything" and "Love Will Follow".

Background 

Outside: From the Redwoods is Loggins' second live album. The concert was recorded live on June 23, 1993 at the Shakespeare Santa Cruz festival in Santa Cruz, California, with the played live setlist including several songs not appearing on the eventual album, such as "Forever". The concert video broadcast on PBS features a shuffled setlist and additionally included the songs "Return to Pooh Corner", "Will of the Wild" and "Watching the River Run / Danny's Song". The videotape was nominated for an Emmy in the "Best Mixing" category for 1994.

Track listing
 "Conviction of the Heart" – (Loggins, Thomas) – 5:36
 "What a Fool Believes" – (Loggins, McDonald) Duet with Michael McDonald – 4:12
 "Your Mama Don't Dance" – (Loggins, Messina) – 4:13
 "I Would Do Anything" – (Loggins, Foster) Duet with Shanice – 7:36
 "Now and Then" – (Loggins, Bouchard) – 3:31
 "Angry Eyes" – (Loggins, Messina) – 4:48
 "If You Believe" – (Loggins, Wood) – 6:04
 "Celebrate Me Home" – (Loggins, Bob James) – 8:02
 "Love Will Follow" – (Loggins, Snow) Duet with Shanice – 5:53
 "Leap of Faith" – (Loggins, Thomas) 6:54
 "This Is It" (Loggins, McDonald) – 4:18
 "Footloose" – (Loggins, Dean Pitchford) – 4:03
 "I'm Alright" – (Loggins) 8:48

Video Track listing
 "Conviction of the Heart" – (Loggins, Thomas)
 "What a Fool Believes" – (Loggins, McDonald) Duet with Michael McDonald
 "Your Mama Don't Dance" – (Loggins, Messina)
 "Return to Pooh Corner" – (Loggins)
 "Now and Then" – (Loggins, Bouchard)
 "Will of the Wind" – (Loggins, Will Ackerman) Duet with Will Ackerman
 "Watching the River Run/Danny's Song" – (Messina, Loggins/Loggins)
 "If You Believe" – (Loggins, Wood)
 "This Is It" – (Loggins, McDonald)
 "Love Will Follow" – (Loggins, Snow) Duet with Shanice
 "Leap of Faith" – (Loggins, Thomas)
 "Footloose" – (Loggins, Pitchford)
 "I'm Alright" – (Loggins)
 "Forever" – (Loggins, Foster, Eva Ein)

Personnel

Primary Artists

 Kenny Loggins (Primary artist)
 Michael McDonald (Primary artist)
 Shanice (Primary artist)
 Will Ackerman (Guest Artist)
 Sonny Landreth (Guest Artist)
 Marc Russo (Guest Artist)

Instruments

 Steve Conn – accordion, piano
 Freddie Washington (Ready Freddie Washington) – bass guitar, background vocals
 Alvino Bennett – drums
 Herman Matthews – drums
 Chris Rodriguez – guitar,  background vocals
 Kenny Loggins – guitar
 Howard Levy – harmonica, mandolin
 Marc Russo – saxophone, organ
 Ed Mann – percussion, gong, surdo,  vibraphone
 Kevin Ricard – percussion, bata, djembe,  background vocals
 Lynn Fiddmont – percussion, bells, shaker, background vocals
 Munyungo Jackson – percussion, berimbau, shekere
 Steve George – piano, synthesizer, organ,  background vocals
 Sonny Landreth – guitar, slide guitar

Additional Vocals

 Janette Crutch – Choir/Chorus
 Lynn Fiddmont – Choir/Chorus
 Sonny Landreth – Choir/Chorus
 Ed Mann – Choir/Chorus
 Herman Matthews – Choir/Chorus
 Barbara Riley – Choir/Chorus
 Julia Waters – Choir/Chorus
 Luther Waters – Choir/Chorus
 Oren Waters – Choir/Chorus
 Maxine Willard Waters – Choir/Chorus
 Don Williams – Choir/Chorus
 Nancy Williams – Choir/Chorus

Arrangements

 Steve Croes – Arranger
 Kenny Loggins – Arranger
 Robbie Nevil – Arranger
 Jeff Bouchard – Composer
 David Foster – Composer
 George Harrison – Composer
 Bob James – Composer
 V. McCoy – Composer
 Michael McDonald  – Composer
 Jim Messina – Composer
 Dean Pitchford – Composer
 Tom Snow – Composer
 Guy Thomas – Composer
 Cindy Walker – Composer
 Steve Wood – Composer
 Gary Wright – Composer

Production

 A. West – Art Direction,  illustrations
 Charlie Bouis – Assistant Engineer
 Guy Charbonneau – Assistant Engineer
 David Gallo – Assistant Engineer
 Steve Croes – Associate Producer
 Joe Gastwirt – Mastering
 Bert Battaglia – Mixing
 Bruce Botnick – Mixing
 Rail Jon Rogut – Mixing
 Peter Kelsey – Mixing
 John Schmit – Mixing
 Rich Veltrop – Mixing
 Dennis Keeley – Photography
 Kenny Loggins – Producer
 Terry Nelson – Producer, engineer,  mixing
 Colleen Donahue-Reynolds – Production Coordination

Charts

Television 

|-
| 1994
| Kenny Loggins: Outside From The Redwoods (PBS) 
 Bruce Botnick, Sound Mixer
 Peter R. Kelsey, Sound Mixer
 Terry Nelson, Sound Mixer
|Emmy: Outstanding Individual Achievement in Sound Mixing  For a Variety or Music Series or a Special
| 
|}

Notes

External links 
 

Kenny Loggins albums
1993 live albums
Columbia Records live albums